Embletonia is a genus of gastropods in the suborder Cladobranchia. It is the only family in the monotypic family Embletoniidae.

Taxonomy
The genus Embletonia and its parent family Embletoniidae were named after Dennis Embleton, a British naturalist (1810-1900). Two genera are recognised:
 Embletonia gracilis Risbec, 1928 
 Embletonia pulchra (Alder & Hancock, 1844)

Distribution and habitat
Species of the genus have a cosmopolitan distribution.

References

External links
 Alder, J.; Hancock, A. (1844). Descriptions of Pterochilus, a new genus of nudibranchiate Mollusca, and two new species of Doris. Annals and Magazine of Natural History. 14: 329-331.
 Gofas, S.; Le Renard, J.; Bouchet, P. (2001). Mollusca. in: Costello, M.J. et al. (eds), European Register of Marine Species: a check-list of the marine species in Europe and a bibliography of guides to their identification. Patrimoines Naturels. 50: 180-213
 ICZN. (1966). Opinion 782. Embletonia Alder & Hancock, 1851 (Gastropoda): Validated under the plenary powers. Bulletin of Zoological Nomenclature. 23: 106-107

Embletoniidae
Gastropod genera